Rita H. Smart (born November 13, 1948, in Jessamine County, Kentucky) is an American politician and a Democratic member of the Kentucky House of Representatives representing District 81 since January 4, 2011. She was unseated by C. Wesley Morgan of Richmond in the 2016 General Election.

Education
Smart earned her BS from Eastern Kentucky University and her MS from the University of Kentucky.

Elections
2012 Smart was unopposed for the May 22, 2012 Democratic Primary and won the November 6, 2012 General election with 10,263 votes (61.4%) against Republican nominee Mary Long.
2010 When District 81 Representative Harry Moberly retired and left the seat open, Smart won the May 18, 2010 Democratic Primary with 3,304 votes (59.1%) and won the November 2, 2010 General election with 6,778 votes (55.8%) against Republican nominee Tiffany Nash.

References

External links
Official page at the Kentucky General Assembly
Campaign site

Rita Smart at Ballotpedia
Rita H. Smart at the National Institute on Money in State Politics

1948 births
Living people
Eastern Kentucky University alumni
Democratic Party members of the Kentucky House of Representatives
People from Jessamine County, Kentucky
People from Richmond, Kentucky
University of Kentucky alumni
Women state legislators in Kentucky
21st-century American politicians
21st-century American women politicians